The Museumslandschaft Hessen Kassel represents a group of institutions in Kassel, Germany, comprising museums, associated research libraries, and supporting facilities. They are overseen by the German federal government in collaboration with Germany's federal state of Hesse. The central complex of Schloss Wilhelmshöhe with installed art in the park and grounds was added to the UNESCO list of World Heritage Sites in 2013.

The museum locations are:

Bergpark Wilhelmshöhe 

 Herkules
 Wasserspiele
 Schloss Wilhelmshöhe
 Löwenburg
 Gewächshaus
 Ballhaus
 Kleinarchitekturen

Staatspark Karlsaue

 Karlsaue
 Insel Siebenbergen
 Orangerie
 Astronomisch-Physikalisches Kabinett
 Planetarium
 Westpavillon
 Marmorbad

Schlosspark Wilhelmsthal

 Schloss Wilhelmsthal
 Schloss Friedrichstein

Other art museums
 Neue Galerie
 Hessisches Landesmuseum
 Deutsches Tapetenmuseum

References

External links 

 Official website